Eucapperia is a genus of moths in the family Pterophoridae.

Species
Eucapperia bullifera Meyrick, 1918
Eucapperia continentalis Gielis, 2008
Eucapperia longiductus (Gibeaux, 1992 

Oxyptilini
Moth genera